The 2007 Nordea Nordic Light Open was a women's tennis tournament played on outdoor hard courts. It was the 6th edition of the Nordea Nordic Light Open, and was part of the Tier IV Series of the 2007 WTA Tour. It took place in Stockholm, Sweden, from 30 July until 5 August 2007.

Second-seeded Agnieszka Radwańska won the singles title and it was also her first career title. The tournament's doubles competition was won by Anabel Medina Garrigues and Virginia Ruano Pascual.

Finals

Singles

 Agnieszka Radwańska defeated  Vera Dushevina, 6–1, 6–1
 It was Radwańska's 1st title of her career.

Doubles

 Anabel Medina Garrigues /  Virginia Ruano Pascual defeated  Chan Chin-wei /  Tetiana Luzhanska, 6–1, 5–7, [10–6]

External links
 ITF tournament edition details
 Tournament draws

Nordea Nordic Light Open
Nordea Nordic Light Open
2007 in Swedish women's sport
2000s in Stockholm
July 2007 sports events in Europe
August 2007 sports events in Europe
Nordic